Stanari Thermal Power Plant, hereinafter referred to as Stanari TPP, is a 300 MW power plant in Bosnia and Herzegovina in the vicinity of the Stanari Coal Mine, approximately 70 kilometers east of Banja Luka in Republika Srpska.  The power plant entered final testing in early 2016 and achieved commercial operation in September 2016. It now operates synchronously with the electricity grid of Bosnia and Herzegovina.

General information
The 300 MW thermal power plant produces 2 million MWh of energy per year. Coal is supplied from the adjacent Stanari coal mine which underwent refurbishment in 2006 in order to provide a stable fuel supply to the power station. According to EFT, the construction of the power plant created 1200 new jobs during the construction phase and around 800 permanent jobs after completion. Beneficiaries have included and continue to include the construction industry, various suppliers, logistics and other service providers in Bosnia and Herzegovina.

Ownership and financing
The power plant is 100 per cent owned by UK-based EFT Group, an energy trading and investment firm, operating in south-east, central and western Europe, as well as Turkey and the Baltics, with the stated aim of being the first privately owned integrated power company in south-east Europe. The total cost of the Stanari project was approximately EUR 500 million. China Development Bank provided a 350 million euro loan to construct the facility and China's Dongfang Electric Corporation was engaged by the owner, EFT, to build it. This is the largest credit facility agreed for a private enterprise concern in Bosnia and Herzegovina to date. EFT financed the balance of the construction costs from its own equity.

Environmental impact

According to statements issued by various regional NGOs in 2013, an alleged lack of an appropriate environmental assessment suggested the plant would fail to abide by EU directives and minimize harmful impacts on the environment.  This resulted in a complaint to the EU's Energy Community Secretariat, which however rejected the complaint, finding that, by contrast, ‘the authorities of Republika Srpska conducted a proper environmental impact assessment procedure’.

References

External links

 Secretariat, 2015 Implementation Report, Bosnia and Herzegovina Country Report
 Analysis on the compliance of the environmental permit for Stanari thermal power plant with EU Directives.
 Dirty Bosnian coal plant shows holes in China’s green investment drive.
  Stanari Thermal Power Plant at SourceWatch

Coal-fired power stations in Bosnia and Herzegovina